Marine engineer may refer to:
Engineering officer (ship), a licensed mariner that operates and maintains a ship's engines
A practitioner of marine engineering, a field of engineering

See also
Engineer (disambiguation)